Zavegepant, sold under the brand name Zavzpret, is a medication used for the treatment of migraine. Zavegepant is a calcitonin gene-related peptide receptor antagonist. It is sprayed into the nose. It is sold by Pfizer.

The most common adverse reactions include taste disorders, nausea, nasal discomfort, and vomiting.

Zavegepant was approved for medical use in the United States in March 2023.

Medical uses 
Zavegepant is indicated for the acute treatment of migraine with or without aura in adults.

References

Further reading

External links 
 
 

Antimigraine drugs
Calcitonin gene-related peptide receptor antagonists
Pfizer brands
Piperazines
Piperidines
Indazoles
Quinolines
Ureas